Story of a Rabbit is a stage production created and performed by Hugh Hughes, in collaboration with British touring theatre company Hoipolloi.

Themes
In the production, Hughes discusses his father's death and the impact it had upon him. He also introduces a subplot featuring the death of a rabbit he was once looking after for a friend, weaving the two stories together as he explores the mysteries surrounding death.

Related
Story of a Rabbit is the second show created by Hughes, the first being Floating. Story of a Rabbit was nominated for a Total Theatre Award and won a Scotsman Fringe First Award at the 2007 Edinburgh Festival Fringe.

References

External links 
 All About Hugh Hughes on Hoipolloi website 
 

Welsh plays